The Butts County School District is a public school district in Butts County, Georgia, United States, based in Jackson, Georgia. It serves the communities of Flovilla, Jackson, and Jenkinsburg, Georgia.

Schools
The Butts County School District has three elementary schools, one middle school, and one high school.

Elementary schools
Hampton L. Daughtry Elementary School
Jackson Elementary School
Stark Elementary School

Middle school
Henderson Middle School

High school
Jackson High School

References

External links
Butts County School District

School districts in Georgia (U.S. state)
Education in Butts County, Georgia